The 2021–22 Liga Leumit will be the 23rd season as second tier since its re-alignment in 1999 and the 80th season of second-tier football in Israel.

A total of sixteen teams will be contesting in the league, including twelve sides from the 2020-21 season, the two promoted teams from 2020–21 Liga Alef and the two relegated teams from 2020–21 Israeli Premier League.

Changes from 2020–21 season

Team changes

The following teams have changed division since the 2020–21 season.

To Liga Leumit

Promoted from Liga Alef

 Hapoel Ashdod (South Division)
 Maccabi Bnei Reineh (North Division)

Relegated from Premier League

 Bnei Yehuda Tel Aviv
 Hapoel Kfar Saba

From Liga Leumit

Promoted to Premier League

 Hapoel Nof HaGalil
 Hapoel Jerusalem

Relegated to Liga Alef

 Hapoel Iksal
 Hapoel Kfar Shalem

Overview

Stadions and locations

The club is playing their home games at a neutral venue because their own ground does not meet league requirements.

Standings

Results

Position by round

Promotion playoffs

Relegation playoffs

Promotion/relegation playoff
The 14th-placed team faced 2021–22 Liga Alef promotion play-offs winner in a one game.

See also
 Toto Cup Leumit

References

2021–22 in Israeli football leagues
Liga Leumit seasons
Isr